This is a list of episodes for the first season of The Ellen DeGeneres Show, which aired from September 8, 2003 to May 28, 2004.

Episodes

References

External links
 

1
2003 American television seasons
2004 American television seasons